Frezzolini is an Italian surname. Notable people with the surname include:

Erminia Frezzolini (1818-1884), Italian opera singer
Giorgio Frezzolini (born 1976), Italian football player
Giuseppe Frezzolini (1789-1861), Italian opera singer

Italian-language surnames